The spinal accessory nucleus lies within the cervical spinal cord (C1-C5) in the posterolateral aspect of the anterior horn. The nucleus ambiguus is classically said to provide the "cranial component" of the accessory nerve. However, the very existence of this cranial component has been recently questioned and seen as contributing exclusively to the vagus nerve.

The terminology continues to be used in describing both human anatomy, and that of other animals.

Additional images

References

External links
 Sylvius
 University of New Mexico
 Georgetown

Accessory nerve
Cranial nerve nuclei
Medulla oblongata